Bogdan Zając  (born 16 November 1972) is a Polish professional football coach and a former player. He currently serves as an assistant manager of Wisła Kraków, where he spent many seasons in the Polish Ekstraklasa as a player. From 2009 until 2019, he served as an assistant under Adam Nawałka at GKS Katowice, Górnik Zabrze, the Poland national team and Lech Poznań. Zając made one appearance for the Poland national football team against Slovakia in 1998.

References

External links
 
 Bogdan Zając at Footballdatabase

1972 births
Living people
Polish footballers
Poland international footballers
Polish expatriate footballers
Ekstraklasa players
Cypriot First Division players
Wisła Kraków players
Zagłębie Lubin players
Widzew Łódź players
FC Kärnten players
Nea Salamis Famagusta FC players
Hutnik Nowa Huta players
Shenzhen F.C. players
JKS 1909 Jarosław players
Expatriate footballers in Austria
Polish expatriate sportspeople in China
Expatriate footballers in Cyprus
Polish expatriate sportspeople in Austria
Expatriate footballers in China
People from Jarosław
Sportspeople from Podkarpackie Voivodeship
Chinese Super League players
Association football defenders
Polish football managers
Górnik Zabrze managers
Jagiellonia Białystok managers
Ekstraklasa managers
II liga managers